Tejkunipara is the name of a neighborhood in Tejgaon Thana of Dhaka city. It is close to the Farmgate neighborhood. Thousands of people live here. All kinds of people live here with different professions.

Location 
Its geographical coordinates are 23° 46' 0" North, 90° 25' 0" East. It is closer to
Farmgate area.Monipuri para is located to westward, West Nakhalpara is to
Northward and  Farmgate is to southward.

Bank 
Many important banks like Sonali Bank; Janata Bank have outlets in Tejkunipara.

Education
Over the last fifty years Tejkunipara has been the home of many renowned schools and colleges, like Holy Cross Girls' High School;Holy Cross College,Government Science College, Bottomley Home Girls' High School, and Tejgaon Government High School. It is also home of Green University of Bangladesh.

Important structures 
 Holy Rosary Church
 Pir-Ma Mosque
 Bottomley Home Orphanage

References 

Dhaka District